The 1999 Seattle Seahawks season was the franchise's 24th season in the National Football League (NFL), the last playing their home games at the Kingdome and the first under head coach Mike Holmgren. It was also the first season that Seattle made the playoffs in eleven seasons. It would be Seattle's last playoff appearance as an American Football Conference (AFC) team. They would not return to the playoffs until 2003, after being moved to the National Football Conference (NFC).

Offseason
After the 1998 season, head coach Mike Holmgren left Green Bay to become the coach of the Seahawks. Holmgren was hired on January 8, 1999, to be the executive vice president, general manager and head coach.

NFL draft

Personnel

Staff

Final roster

     Starters in bold.
 (*) Denotes players that were selected for the 2000 Pro Bowl.

Schedule

Preseason

Source: Seahawks Media Guides

Regular season
Divisional matchups have the AFC West playing the NFC Central.

Bold indicates division opponents.
Source: 1999 NFL season results

Postseason

This game was the last event held in the Kingdome (1976–2000). On March 26, 2000, the Kingdome was imploded to make way for Seahawks Stadium.

Standings

Game Summaries

Preseason

Week P1: vs. Buffalo Bills

Week P2: at San Francisco 49ers

Week P3: vs. Arizona Cardinals

Week P4: at Indianapolis Colts

Regular season

Week 1: vs. Detroit Lions

Week 2: at Chicago Bears

Week 3: at Pittsburgh Steelers

Week 4: vs. Oakland Raiders

Week 6: at San Diego Chargers

Week 7: vs. Buffalo Bills

Week 8: at Green Bay Packers

As of 2021, this remains the last time the Seahawks defeated the Packers at Lambeau Field.

Week 9: vs. Cincinnati Bengals

Week 10: vs. Denver Broncos

Week 11: at Kansas City Chiefs

Week 12: vs. Tampa Bay Buccaneers

Week 13: at Oakland Raiders

Week 14: vs. San Diego Chargers

Week 15 at Denver Broncos

Week 16: vs. Kansas City Chiefs

Week 17: at New York Jets

Postseason

Seattle entered the postseason as the #3 seed in the AFC.

AFC Wild Card Playoff: vs. #6 Miami Dolphins

References

External links
 Seahawks draft history at NFL.com
 1999 NFL season results at NFL.com

Seattle
Seattle Seahawks seasons
AFC West championship seasons
Seattle